The 2018–19 Michigan Wolverines women's basketball team represented the University of Michigan during the 2018–19 NCAA Division I women's basketball season. The Wolverines, led by head coach Kim Barnes Arico in her seventh year, played their home games at the Crisler Center. This season marked the program's 37th season as a member of the Big Ten Conference.

Michigan finished the season with a 22–12 record, including 11–7 in Big Ten play, to finish in fourth place in the Big Ten Conference. The team advanced to the semifinals of the Big Ten Conference women's basketball tournament for the first time since 2001, where they lost to Maryland. They received an at-large bid to the 2019 NCAA Division I women's basketball tournament, where they defeated Kansas State in the first round before losing to Louisville in the second round.

Previous season
The Wolverines finished the 2017–18 season with a 23–10 record, including 10–6 in Big Ten play to finish in sixth place. They advanced to the quarterfinals of the Big Ten women's tournament where they lost to Nebraska. They received an at-large bid to the 2018 NCAA Division I women's basketball tournament where they defeated Northern Colorado in the first round, before losing to Baylor in the second round.

Roster

Schedule

|-
! colspan="9" style="background:#242961; color:#F7BE05;"| Exhibition

|-
! colspan="9" style="background:#242961; color:#F7BE05;"| Non-conference regular season

|-
! colspan="9" style="background:#242961; color:#F7BE05;"| Big Ten conference season

|-
! colspan="9" style="background:#242961; color:#F7BE05;"| Big Ten Women's Tournament

|-
! colspan="9" style="background:#242961; color:#F7BE05;"| NCAA Women's Tournament

Rankings

^Coaches did not release a Week 2 poll.

References

Michigan
Michigan Wolverines women's basketball seasons
Michigan
Michigan
Michigan